Alfred Jönsson (born 21 February 1998) is a Swedish handball player for Skjern Håndbold and the Swedish national team.

He represented Sweden at the 2021 World Men's Handball Championship.

References

External links

1998 births
Living people
Swedish male handball players
Sportspeople from Lund
Expatriate handball players
Swedish expatriate sportspeople in Denmark
Swedish expatriate sportspeople in Germany
Handball-Bundesliga players
Lugi HF players
IFK Skövde players
21st-century Swedish people